In 1998, 1. deild was the top tier league in Faroe Islands football (since 2005, the top tier has been the Faroe Islands Premier League, with 1. deild becoming the second tier).

This article details the statistics of 1. deild in the 1998 season.

Overview
It was contested by 10 teams, and Havnar Bóltfelag won the championship.

League standings

Results
The schedule consisted of a total of 18 games. Each team played two games against every opponent in no particular order. One of the games was at home and one was away.

Top goalscorers
Source: faroesoccer.com

20 goals
 Jákup á Borg (B36)

18 goals
 John Petersen (B36)
 Kurt Mørkøre (KÍ)
 Súni Fríði Barbá (HB)

17 goals
 Allan Mørkøre (HB)

12 goals
 Henning Jarnskor (GÍ)
 Sámal Joensen (GÍ)

10 goals
 Rógvi Jacobsen (KÍ)

9 goals
 Fróði Benjaminsen (B68)

1. deild seasons
Faroe
Faroe
1